Marco Rodolfo Matellini Walker (born January 18, 1972 in Lima) is a Peruvian sport shooter. At age thirty-six, Matellini made his official debut for the 2008 Summer Olympics in Beijing, where he competed in the men's skeet shooting. He finished only in fortieth place by four points ahead of Syria's Roger Dahi, for a total score of 95 targets.

References

External links
NBC 2008 Olympics profile

Peruvian male sport shooters
Skeet shooters
Living people
Olympic shooters of Peru
Shooters at the 2008 Summer Olympics
Pan American Games competitors for Peru
Shooters at the 2011 Pan American Games
Shooters at the 2003 Pan American Games
Sportspeople from Lima
1972 births
20th-century Peruvian people
21st-century Peruvian people